Bo District is a district in the Southern Province of Sierra Leone. It is one of the sixteen Districts of Sierra Leone. Bo District is the second most populous District in Sierra Leone. Its capital and largest city is the city of Bo, which is also the second most populous city in Sierra Leone.  other major towns in the district include Baoma, Bumpeh, Serabu, Sumbuya, Baiima and Yele. 

Bo District borders Kenema District to the east, Tonkolili District to the north, Moyamba District to the west, Bonthe District to the southwest and Pujehun District to the south. The district population as of 2015 is 574,201.  Bo District occupies a total area of 5,219 km2 and is subdivided into fifteen chiefdoms.

The population of Bo District is mainly from the Mende ethnic group, though the city of Bo has a very ethnic diverse population.

Government
Bo District has its own directly elected local government called District Council  and is where executive and legislative authority is vested at local level within Bo District. The Bo District Council is Headed by a council chairman, who is an elected official and is responsible for the general management of the district. The current council Chairman of Bo District is Joseph Munda Bindi of the Sierra Leone People's Party (SLPP), following his election victory in the 2018 Sierra Leone local election.

The city of Bo also has its own directly elected city council headed by a mayor. The current mayor of Bo is Harold Logie Tucker, he is a member of the opposition Sierra Leone People's Party (SLPP). Bo District is a stronghold of the ruling Sierra Leone People's Party.

Members of Parliament of Sierra Leone from Bo District
Bo District currently has twelve Representatives in the Parliament of Sierra Leone, of which eleven members were elected for a 5-year term in the 2007 general elections. The district is a stronghold of the opposition Sierra Leone People's Party (SLPP). The following is a list of Representatives and affiliations:

Demographics of Bo District

Ethnicity
The population of Bo District is ethnically and culturally diverse, particularly in the city of Bo, Sierra Leone's second largest city. The Mende people form the largest ethnic group in Bo District at over 60 percent of the population.

Religion

Economy
With Bo being the second largest city in Sierra Leone, trading, gold and diamond mining are major economic activities for the district; as well as agricultural production of rice growing, and coffee, cacao and oil palm.

Education
Bo District is home to 385 Primary Schools and 40 Secondary Schools. Bo Government Secondary School, commonly called Bo School is among the 40 secondary schools in Bo District. The school was founded in 1906 by Leslie Probyn to educate the children of Bo District. The school has a long history of developing the elite of Sierra Leone, especially the country's politicians.

Recovery after Civil War 

Bo District suffered badly at the hands of rebel forces during 1994–1995, and many major towns were almost entirely destroyed (Tikonko and Bumpe, for example).  However, since the ousting of the Junta in early 1998, Bo District has remained secure, due mainly to the strong presence of the Civil Defence Forces.  As such, rather than suffering from displacement, Bo district has been the recipient of displaced persons from less secure parts of the country.

Although aid agencies have had uninterrupted access to the district for five years because of its relative stability, most of the recovery efforts were concentrated in Bo Town leaving out the 8 sections in Kakua chiefdom as well as all the other 14 chiefdoms in the district.

The major recovery needs according to sectoral priorities are as follows: Road rehabilitation, Education, Water and Sanitation, Health, Agriculture, Restoration of Local Government Structures and Shelter.

Administrative divisions

Chiefdoms
The district is made up of fifteen chiefdoms as the third level of administrative subdivision.

Badjia – Ngelehun
Bagbo – Jimmi
Bagbwe – Ngarlu
Baoma – Baoma
Bumpe–Gao – Bumpe
Gbo – Gbo
Jaiama Bongor – Telu
Kakua – Kakua
Komboya – Njala
Lugbu – Sumbuya
Niawa Lenga – Nengbema
Selenga – Dambala
Tikonko – Tikonko
Valunia – Mongere
Wonde – Gboyama

Major towns

Bo, capital and largest city
Boama
Serabu
Bumpe
Mongeri, second largest town
Sumbuya
Baiima
Tikonko

 Gondama

Towns and villages

Bambima
Bandeh
Bumbe
Koribindu
Mamboma
Mange
Momboma
Sembehun
Telu
Tokoronko
Jimmi Bagbo
Mondorkor

 Gandohun -Tikonko
 Gondama

Notable people from Bo District
Solomom Berewa, former vice president of Sierra Leone
Joe Robert Pemagbi, Sierra Leone ambassador to the UN
Aluspah Brewah, football star
Hinga Norman, Politician
Joseph Henry Ganda, Archbishop
Emerson Samba, Football star
Edward Jeffrey Boima, I.T. Technician, Administrator. former I.T. Lecturer Sulisha Institute of Management and Technology. Cureent Administrative Secretary for Sierra Leone Association of Cassava Producers and Processors
Chief Joe Lahai Boima Gbondo, Chiefdom Administrative Court Speaker, Judges 
Cllr. Edmond Koroma, Accountant, Politician
Prof. Dr. Jia Bainga Kangbai, Academic, reputable journalist

See also
Sierra Leone
Sierra Leone Civil War
Albert Joe Demby, former Vice President of Sierra Leone
Victor Bockarie Foh, former Vice President of Sierra Leone

References

External links
https://web.archive.org/web/20070121122533/http://www.statehouse-sl.org/member-parliament.html
https://web.archive.org/web/20070928043611/http://news.sl/drwebsite/publish/article_20052169.shtml
https://web.archive.org/web/20061129153754/http://www.directrelief.org/sections/our_work/notes_sierra_leone.html
Parts of this article reproduced with permission from http://www.daco-sl.org

Districts of Sierra Leone
Southern Province, Sierra Leone